Newstime is a German television news program on ProSieben, presented by journalists Michael Marx and Laura Dünnwald. The first broadcast took place on 1 January 1989, the day ProSieben itself started broadcasting.

Newstime airs live at 18:00 CET, and includes news, with an emphasis on political news from Germany, Europe and the world, plus 'mixed' news from entertainment.

The main program usually has a length of 10 minutes (including a weather forecast).  Around 03:00 CET, a shorter show called ProSieben Spätnachrichten (ProSieben late news) is broadcast.

Trivia 
 The ProSieben TV channel and its show Newstime were briefly shown twice in Captain America: Civil War. The first time was in a hotel room in Berlin while Helmut Zemo was studying a Soviet diary on The Winter Soldier. Michael Marx and Laura Dünnwald starred as themselves.

External links 
 Official site
 Newstime at fernsehserien.de
 

ProSieben original programming
German television news shows
1989 German television series debuts
1990s German television series
2000s German television series
2010s German television series
German-language television shows